Edda Fabbri (born 1949 Montevideo) is a Uruguayan writer. She was awarded the Casa de las Américas Prize for her testimonial novel Oblivion, which narrates her experiences as a political prisoner of the civic-military dictatorship of Uruguay.

Life 
Her interest in leftist movements began at an early age, when she studied the speeches of Fidel Castro. Later, during the 60s and 70s, she studied at the Faculty of Medicine where he joined the student movement.

In 1971, she joined the Tupamaros National Liberation Movement. A few months later, she was imprisoned in a jail in Montevideo, where they took the prisoners of common crimes. A month later, she managed to escape through pipes and tunnels with the help of her colleagues who planned the escape from the outside. After nine months of freedom, in 1972 she was imprisoned again in Punta de Rieles where she was held for the next 13 years. In February 1985, she was released from jail along with another group of political prisoners. At this time, she had a daughter named Rosario with her partner. Later, her second son, Pedro, was born.

Her first book, Oblivion, won the Casa de las Américas Literary Prize for testimonial literature in 2007. Other stories by her, have been included in Memorias para armar II (2000) and Exilios y tangueces (2009).

Currently, she works for various periodicals and since 2000 she has collaborated in the Semanario Brecha.

Works 
 Oblivion Montevideo : Letraeñe Ediciones, 2007. , 
 Cometa en Montevideo (2007)
 Fabular un país, testimoniar una literatura (2013)

References

External links 

Uruguayan women novelists
Uruguayan novelists
Writers from Montevideo
1949 births
Living people
21st-century Uruguayan writers
21st-century Uruguayan women writers
21st-century novelists
Prisoners and detainees of Uruguay